In the study of age-structured population growth, probably one of the most important equations is the Euler–Lotka equation. Based on the age demographic of females in the population and female births (since in many cases it is the females that are more limited in the ability to reproduce), this equation allows for an estimation of how a population is growing.

The field of mathematical demography was largely developed by Alfred J. Lotka in the early 20th century, building on the earlier work of Leonhard Euler. The Euler–Lotka equation, derived and discussed below, is often attributed to either of its origins: Euler, who derived a special form in 1760, or Lotka, who derived a more general continuous version. The equation in discrete time is given by

where  is the discrete growth rate, ℓ(a) is the fraction of individuals surviving to age a and b(a) is the number of offspring born to an individual of age a during the time step.  The sum is taken over the entire life span of the organism.

Derivations

Lotka's continuous model
A.J. Lotka in 1911 developed a continuous model of population dynamics as follows.  This model tracks only the females in the population.

Let B(t)dt be the number of births during the time interval from t to t+dt.  Also define the survival function ℓ(a), the fraction of individuals surviving to age a.  Finally define b(a) to be the birth rate for mothers of age a. The product B(t-a)ℓ(a) therefore denotes the number density of individuals born at t-a and still alive at t, while B(t-a)ℓ(a)b(a) denotes the number of births in this cohort, which suggest the following Volterra integral equation for B:

We integrate over all possible ages to find the total rate of births at time t.  We are in effect finding the contributions of all individuals of age up to t.  We need not consider individuals born before the start of this analysis since we can just set the base point low enough to incorporate all of them.

Let us then guess an exponential solution of the form B(t) = Qert.  Plugging this into the integral equation gives:

or

This can be rewritten in the discrete case by turning the integral into a sum producing

letting  and  be the boundary ages for reproduction or defining the discrete growth rate λ = er we obtain the discrete time equation derived above:

where  is the maximum age, we can extend these ages since b(a) vanishes beyond the boundaries.

From the Leslie matrix
Let us write the Leslie matrix as:

Note that  where ℓ i is the probability of surviving to age , and
, the number of births at age  weighted by the probability of surviving to age .

Now if we have stable growth the growth of the system is an eigenvalue of the matrix since .

Introducing notation  the population in age class  at time , we have .  However also .  This implies that

By the same argument we find that

Continuing inductively we conclude that generally

Considering the top row, we get

Now we may substitute our previous work for the  terms and obtain:

First substitute the definition of the per-capita fertility and divide through by the left hand side:

Now we note the following simplification.  Since  we note that

This sum collapses to:

which is the desired result.

Analysis of expression
From the above analysis we see that the Euler–Lotka equation is in fact the characteristic polynomial of the Leslie matrix.  We can analyze its solutions to find information about the eigenvalues of the Leslie matrix (which has implications for the stability of populations).

Considering the continuous expression f as a function of r, we can examine its roots.  We notice that at negative infinity the function grows to positive infinity and at positive infinity the function approaches 0.

The first derivative is clearly −af and the second derivative is a2f.  This function is then decreasing, concave up and takes on all positive values.  It is also continuous by construction so by the intermediate value theorem, it crosses r = 1 exactly once.  Therefore, there is exactly one real solution, which is therefore the dominant eigenvalue of the matrix the equilibrium growth rate.

This same derivation applies to the discrete case.

Relationship to replacement rate of populations
If we let λ = 1 the discrete formula becomes the replacement rate of the population.

Further reading
 
 
 

Demography
Leonhard Euler